Grant Stevens (born 27 October 1953 in Walcha, New South Wales, Australia) is an Australian singer and lyricist who has been based in Germany since the 1970s. He left his homeland in the 1970s for London, where he recorded various albums and singles for his bands The Soho Jets and Razar, produced by The Who producer Kit Lambert. From 1981 to 1984 he worked as singer in the German band Nervous Germans.

He recorded the German hit "Everlasting Friends", which was used as a TV jingle for Holsten Pilsener in Europe. In 1999, together with Der Graf and José Alvarez-Brill (Wolfsheim, Joachim Witt, De/Vision) the foundation for Unheilig was laid. The single "Sage Ja!" was released on Bloodline Records in 1999, shot straight into the German DAC charts and became a club smash. In February 2001, the debut album Phosphor came on to the European market again on Bloodline/Connected Music.

He has since written the German lyrics to two musicals; Die Schöne und das Biest and Robin Hood and lives in Berlin where he sings with Nervous Germans and works as a vocal coach.

Stevens was also featured on Xandria's album India in 2005.

References

External links 
 Nervous Germans John Peel Sessions 

Australian male singers
Australian songwriters
Living people
1953 births
Australian expatriates in Germany